Klára Koukalová (formerly Zakopalová; born 24 February 1982) is a retired Czech tennis player. She was born and still lives in Prague.  Having turned professional in 1999, she reached a career-high singles ranking of world No. 20, on 15 April 2013. In doubles, she reached a career-high ranking of 31, on 19 May 2014. Koukalová won three WTA singles titles and four doubles titles during her career.

Career

2003–2009
Koukalová made her Grand Slam debut at the 2003 Australian Open, defeating fellow qualifier and Grand Slam debutante Maria Sharapova in the first round before going on to upset sixth-seed Monica Seles. Her run ended in the third round.

In January 2006, she played comeback player Martina Hingis, at the WTA Tour tournament in Gold Coast, where she lost in the second round. Koukalová was seeded 29th at the Australian Open, but lost in the first round to Ekaterina Bychkova. In that year, she had ten first-round losses in singles and failed to win a doubles match.

In 2008, Koukalová reached the final of the inaugural Cachantún Cup in Chile. She played the top seed Flavia Pennetta, but was forced to retire due to a sprained ankle. This also forced her to withdraw from the next tournament in Bogotá, where she had made the quarterfinals in 2007.

Koukalová's biggest win came at the 2009 Andalucia Tennis Experience in Marbella, Spain. She defeated world No. 1 and ten-time Grand Slam champion, Serena Williams, in three sets. Williams was also her first-round opponent at the French Open, Koulalová this time lost.

2010
She gained another good win over a top-5 player, defeating Dinara Safina in the first round of the Madrid Open.

In the first round of the Warsaw Open, Koukalová caused a big upset by defeating fourth seed and world No. 14, Marion Bartoli. She was then defeated by world No. 205, Gréta Arn, in the second round.

At the Wimbledon Championships, Koukalová advanced to the fourth round for the first time at a Grand Slam. She scored upset wins over 18th seed Aravane Rezaï and tenth seed Flavia Pennetta, before falling to qualifier Kaia Kanepi.

Koukalová made the final at the Danish Open, where she lost to then world No. 3, Caroline Wozniacki. She defeated Rossana de los Rios, Tatjana Malek, Sorana Cîrstea, and Li Na en route to the final. After this tournament, she could not match her performance as she went on to do poorly in her last four tournaments, only advancing to the second round at Linz, where she lost to Patty Schnyder.

2011

Koukalová started season at the Hobart International. Seeded fifth, she lost in her semifinal match to sixth seed and eventual champion, Jarmila Groth. At the Australian Open, Koukalová was defeated in the second round by 31st seed Lucie Šafářová.

Playing in at Paris Indoor, Koukalová lost in the second round to seventh seed Yanina Wickmayer.
She was seeded 31st for the French Open, her first seeding at a Grand Slam tournament since 2006. She was upset in the first round by Taiwanese qualifier Chan Yung-jan.

After her defeat at Roland Garros, Koukalová traveled to Copenhagen to defend her finalist points from the year before. Seeded second, she was upset in the first round by German Kathrin Wörle.

Koukalová then returned to the site of her greatest Grand Slam accomplishment, Wimbledon. Unseeded, she came from a set down to defeat British wildcard Emily Webley-Smith in the first round. In the second round, she avenged her Australian Open loss by upsetting 31st seed Lucie Šafářová in three sets. In the third round, Koukalová fell to eventual finalist Maria Sharapova.

She then made the semifinals in Budapest, where she lost to the eventual champion Roberta Vinci, and then made the quarterfinals in Palermo, where she lost to eventual finalist Polona Hercog.

2013

2014

Koukalová began her year at the Shenzhen Open. Despite being the third seed and last year finalist, she lost in the second round to Patricia Mayr-Achleitner. In doubles, she and Niculescu won the title defeating Lyudmyla Kichenok/Nadiia Kichenok in the final. Seeded seventh at the Hobart International, Koukalová reached the final where she was defeated by qualifier Garbiñe Muguruza. However, in doubles, she and Niculescu won the title defeating Lisa Raymond/Zhang Shuai in the final. At the Australian Open, Koukalová lost in the first round to 17th seed Sam Stosur.

In Paris at the indoor event, she was defeated in the second round by fourth seed and 2012 champion Angelique Kerber. During the Fed Cup tie against Spain, Koukalová won her first rubber over María Teresa Torró Flor, but she lost her second rubber to Carla Suárez Navarro. In the end, the Czech Republic defeated Spain 3–2. At the Qatar Open, she upset ninth seed Ana Ivanovic in the second round. She was defeated in the third round by sixth seed and eventual finalist Angelique Kerber. As the top seed at the first edition of the Rio Open, Koukalová made it to the final where she lost to fifth seed Kurumi Nara. Seeded third at the Brasil Tennis Cup, she won the tournament beating second seed Garbiñe Muguruza in the final; this was her third WTA singles title. Seeded 28th at the Indian Wells Open, Koukalová was defeated in the second round by compatriot Karolína Plíšková. Seeded 27th at the Miami Open, Koukalová lost her second-round match to Caroline Garcia. Seeded fifth at the Katowice Open, Koukalová made it to the quarterfinal round where she was defeated by fourth seed and eventual champion, Alizé Cornet. In doubles, she and Niculescu reached the final where they lost to the pair Yuliya Beygelzimer/Olga Savchuk.

Koukalová began her clay-court season at the Porsche Tennis Grand Prix. She lost in the first round to eighth seed Sara Errani. At the Madrid Open, Koukalová was defeated in the first round by eighth seed and eventual champion, Maria Sharapova. Seeded second at the Sparta Prague Open, she lost in the first round to eventual champion Heather Watson. Seeded third at the Nürnberger Versicherungscup, her final tournament before the French Open, she was defeated in the first round by Polona Hercog. Seeded 30th at the French Open, she lost in the first round to María Teresa Torró Flor.

Seeded sixth at the Birmingham Classic, Koukalová reached the quarterfinal round where she was defeated by top seed and eventual champion Ana Ivanovic. Seeded eighth at the Rosmalen Open, she advanced to the semifinal round where she lost to eventual champion CoCo Vandeweghe. Seeded 31st at the Wimbledon Championships, she was defeated in her second-round match by Madison Keys.

Seeded third at the first edition of the Bucharest Open, Koukalová lost in the first round to Monica Niculescu. Seeded third at the İstanbul Cup, she was defeated in the second round by Kristina Mladenovic.

In Montreal at the Rogers Cup, Koukalová lost in the second round to 11th seed and 2010 champion Caroline Wozniacki. At the Cincinnati Open, she was defeated in the first round by American qualifier Taylor Townsend. Competing at the Connecticut Open, Koukalová lost in the first round to sixth seed Flavia Pennetta. At the US Open, she was defeated in the first round by Petra Cetkovská.

Seeded third at the Korea Open, Koukalová lost in the second round to Maria Kirilenko. Playing at the first edition of the Wuhan Open, she was defeated in the first round by qualifier Zarina Diyas. In Beijing at the China Open, Koukalová lost in the first round to Zarina Diyas. At the Generali Ladies Linz, Koukalová was defeated in the second round by Marina Erakovic. She played her final tournament of the season at the Kremlin Cup and retired during her first-round match against fifth seed Svetlana Kuznetsova due to illness.

Koukalová ended the year ranked 41.

2015

Koukalová began the 2015 season at the Shenzhen Open. Seeded fifth, she lost in the first round to Anna Karolína Schmiedlová. After Shenzhen, she competed at the Hobart International where she was the sixth seed and last year finalist. Despite winning the first set 6-0, she was defeated in the first round by Kurumi Nara. At the Australian Open, she beat Australian wildcard Storm Sanders in the first round. In the second round, she fell to Julia Görges.

In Antwerp, Koukalová was eliminated in the first round by qualifier Francesca Schiavone. At the Dubai Championships, she lost in the first round to Tsvetana Pironkova. She fell in the first round of qualifying at the Qatar Open to Hsieh Su-wei. Seeded fifth at the Malaysian Open, she was defeated in the second round by Carina Witthöft. At the Indian Wells Masters, she beat two-time champion Daniela Hantuchová in her first-round match. In the second round, she lost to 16th seed Madison Keys. At the Miami Open, she was beaten in the first round by Kristina Mladenovic. In Katowice, she lost her quarterfinals match to top seed and home crowd favorite, Agnieszka Radwańska.

Seeded third at the Slovak Open, she was defeated in the first round by eventual champion Danka Kovinić. At the Italian Open, Koukalová lost in the first round of qualifying to Anna Karolína Schmiedlová. In Germany at the Nürnberger Versicherungscup, Koukalová was defeated in the second round by second seed Angelique Kerber. Competing at the second Grand Slam tournament of the year, the French Open, she lost in the first round to Danka Kovinić. 

Beginning grass-court season at the Rosmalen Open, Koukalová was defeated in the second round by Annika Beck. Getting through the qualifying rounds at the Birmingham Classic, she lost in the third round to top seed Simona Halep. In  Eastbourne, Koukalová was defeated in the final round of qualifying by Lauren Davis. At Wimbledon, she lost in the first round to Ajla Tomljanović.

In Contrexéville at the Lorraine Open 88, Koukalová was defeated in the first round by Kristína Kučová. At the Swedish Open, she lost in her quarterfinal match to Yulia Putintseva. Playing in Austria at the Gastein Ladies, Koukalová was defeated in the second round by second seed and eventual champion, Sam Stosur. Seeded third at the first edition of the Prague Open, she lost in the first round to Laura Pous Tió.

Playing in New York at the US Open, Koukalová was defeated in the first round by 19th seed Madison Keys.

Seeded fifth at the Open de Biarritz, she reached the semifinal round where she lost to sixth seed and eventual champion, Laura Siegemund. In Seoul at the Korea Open, Koukalová retired from her first-round match against Magdaléna Rybáriková due to injury. At the Tashkent Open, she was defeated in the first round by qualifier Kateryna Kozlova. Coming through qualifying at the Generali Ladies Linz, Koukalová lost in the first round to Denisa Allertová. Entering the Kremlin Cup as a qualifier, she was defeated in the second round by eventual champion Svetlana Kuznetsova. Koukalová played her final tournament of the season at the Al Habtoor Challenge. Seeded second, she made it to the final where she lost to sixth seed Çağla Büyükakçay.

Koukalová ended the year ranked 106.

2016
Koukalová started her 2016 season at the Hobart International. She lost in the first round of qualifying to Jana Fett. At the Australian Open, she was defeated in the first round by qualifier Nicole Gibbs.

Getting past qualifying at the St. Petersburg Trophy, Koukalová was eliminated in the first round by fifth seed Anastasia Pavlyuchenkova. In Doha, she was beaten in the first round of qualifying by Jana Čepelová. At the Malaysian Open, she lost in her first-round match to Naomi Broady. Playing at the Indian Wells Masters, she was defeated in the first round of qualifying by Verónica Cepede Royg. Competing in Katowice, she fell in her first-round match to qualifier Ekaterina Alexandrova.

Beginning her clay-court season at the Porsche Tennis Grand Prix, Koukalová was beaten in the first round of qualifying by Laura Robson. At the Prague Open, she lost in the first round of qualifying to Amandine Hesse. At the French Open, she reached the final round of qualifying where she was defeated by Çağla Büyükakçay.

In the Birmingham, Koukalová was eliminated in the second round of qualifying by Kateryna Bondarenko. At Wimbledon, she lost in the first round of qualifying to Stephanie Vogt.

On September 26, 2016, Koukalová announced her retirement from tennis.

Personal life
On 6 June 2006, Klára married Czech footballer Jan Zakopal, but they divorced in January 2014. From June 2006 to March 2014, she used her married name Zakopalová while competing, switching back to Koukalová in April 2014.

Performance timelines

Only main-draw results in WTA Tour, Grand Slam tournaments, Fed Cup and Olympic Games are included in win–loss records.

Singles

Doubles

WTA career finals

Singles: 15 (3 titles, 12 runner-ups)

Doubles: 10 (4 titles, 6 runner-ups)

ITF Circuit finals

Singles: 12 (7 titles, 5 runner–ups)

Top 10 wins

Notes

References

External links

 
 
 

1982 births
Living people
Tennis players from Prague
Czech female tennis players
Olympic tennis players of the Czech Republic
Tennis players at the 2004 Summer Olympics
Tennis players at the 2008 Summer Olympics
Tennis players at the 2012 Summer Olympics